The horizon is the line at which the sky and the Earth's surface appear to meet.

Horizon or The Horizon may also refer to:

Art, entertainment, and media

Films
 Horizon (1932 film), a Soviet film
 The Horizon (1961 film), a Soviet film
 Horizon (1971 film), a Hungarian film
 The Horizon (地平線), a 1984 Japanese film by director Kaneto Shindo
 Horizon (1989 film), an Iranian film
 Horizon (2018 film), a Georgian film
 Horizon (upcoming film), an American epic Western

Games
 Horizon (video game series), a series of action role-playing games developed by Guerrilla Games
 Horizon Zero Dawn, a 2017 video game for the PlayStation 4 and Microsoft Windows
 Horizon Forbidden West, a 2022 sequel for PlayStation 4 and PlayStation 5
 Horizons: Empire of Istaria, the original name of the MMORPG Istaria: Chronicles of the Gifted
 Forza Horizon, a 2012 open world racing game for Xbox 360, which became a sub-series for the Forza racing game franchise
 Animal Crossing: New Horizons, a 2020 video game for the Nintendo Switch
 Horizon, a playable character in the game Apex Legends

Music
 Horizons Gorwelion, an annual festival aimed at promoting independent contemporary new music in Wales
 Horizon (band), a German metal band
 Horizon Records, an American record label

Albums 
 Horizon (Culture Beat album), 1991
 Horizon (Eddie Rabbitt album), 1980
 Horizon (Remioromen album), 2006
 Horizon (Sun Ra album), 1972
 Horizon (The Carpenters album), 1975
 Horizon (McCoy Tyner album), 1979
 Horizon, album by BZN
 Horizons (Kris Allen album), 2014
 Horizons (Charles McPherson album), 1968
 Horizons (Parkway Drive album), 2007
 Horizons (Ira Sullivan album), 1987
 Horizons (Starset album), 2021
 Horizon (The Rocking Horse Winner album), 2002

Songs 
 "Horizon" (Jessica Andersson song), Melodifestivalen 2021 entry
 "Horizon", a 2008 single by D'espairsRay
 "Horizon", a song by The Bats from the album At the National Grid
 "Horizon", a song by Diaura from the album Triangle
 "Horizon" (Daft Punk song), on the 2013 album Random Access Memories
 "Horizons" (Genesis song), a song by Genesis on the 1972 album Foxtrot
 "Horizons", a 1994 song by British DJ and drum and bass musician LTJ Bukem
 "Horizon", a song by American musician Cat Power from the 2018 album Wanderer
 "Horizons", a song by the 3rd and the Mortal from the 1996 album Painting on Glass

Periodicals
 Horizon (magazine), British magazine, 1940–1949, founded by Cyril Connolly, Stephen Spender and Peter Watson
 Horizon (online magazine), research and innovation magazine published by the European Commission
 Horizon (U.S. magazine), 1958–1989, originally published by American Heritage
 Horizon Weekly, Armenian-Canadian newspaper publication
 Horizons (magazine), research magazine of the Swiss National Science Foundation and the Swiss Academies of Arts and Sciences
 Horizons: The Journal of the College Theology Society, a religious study journal
 The Horizon: A Journal of the Color Line, U.S. magazine, 1907–1919, edited by W.E.B. Du Bois

Television and web series
 Horizon (British TV series), a long-running British programme on BBC television showing popular science documentaries
 Horizon (Canadian TV program), a 1963–1964 Canadian current affairs television program that aired on CBC
 Arizona Horizon, a current events television program that debuted Arizona-based KAET in 1981
 The Horizon (web series), a web series which premiered on YouTube; it is the most watched online series made in Australia and the most watched gay web series in the world.
 "Horizon" (Star Trek: Enterprise), a 2003 second-season episode of Star Trek: Enterprise

Other arts, entertainment, and media
 Horizon (novel), a 2009 fantasy novel by Lois McMaster Bujold
Horizontes (Horizons), 1913 painting by Francisco Antonio Cano Cardona
 Horizons (ballet), a modern dance work

Companies and brands
 Horizon (camera), a swing-lens panoramic camera manufactured in Russia
 Horizon Fitness, a fitness equipment subsidiary of Johnson Health Tech
 Horizon Fuel Cell Technologies, a corporation specializing in fuel cell technology
 Horizon Nuclear Power, a British energy company
 Horizon Organic, an American company that produces dairy and egg products
 Horizon Pipeline, a small natural gas pipeline that moves gas in northern Illinois
 Horizon Power, a corporation owned by the Government of Western Australia
 Planning horizon, the amount of time an organisation will look into the future when preparing a strategic plan
 Horizons Satellite, a joint venture between Intelsat and SKY Perfect JSAT Group that owns a fleet of Horizons satellites
 Horizon (store), a discount department store
 Warner Horizon Television, Warner Bros Television’s division formed in 2006

Radio and television providers
 Horizont (radio station), or Horizon Radio, a state-owned Bulgarian Radio Station
 Heart 103.3, or Horizon Radio (UK), a UK radio station
 Horizon TV Asia, an television provider in India

Events and organizations
 Horizon League, a collegiate athletic conference in the midwestern USA
 Horizons Regional Council, the regional authority for the Manawatu-Wanganui region of New Zealand
 Horizon 2020, a funding programme by the European Union for innovation and economic growth
 Horizon Europe, continuation of Horizon 2020
 Horizons (political party), French center-right political party

Places
 Horizons Region, official name of Manawatū-Whanganui region in New Zealand
 Horizon, Saskatchewan, hamlet in Saskatchewan, Canada
 Rosemont Horizon, the former name of Allstate Arena, a multipurpose arena in Rosemont, Illinois, United States
 Horizon City, a town in Texas, United States
 Horizons (Epcot), a former Epcot Center attraction at Walt Disney World

Schools
 École secondaire l'Horizon, a French public secondary school in Quebec, Canada
 Horizon High School (disambiguation)
 Horizon Science Academy, a group of charter schools which is owned by Concept Schools in Ohio, United States

Science

Computers and computer science
 Horizon effect, in artificial intelligence: the computational limit beyond which conventional game-tree search algorithms make suboptimal decisions
 Horizons: Software Starter Pack, a 1982 software compilation for the ZX Spectrum
 North Star Horizon, an 8-bit computer system based on the ZiLOG Z80A microprocessor
 Split horizon route advertisement, one of the methods in computer networks used to prevent routing loops
 VMware Horizon, a commercial desktop-virtualisation product released in 2014 (formerly called Horizon View)
 Nintendo Switch system software, internally known as Horizon
 Horizon, a social platform being built by Meta Platforms, encompassing Horizon Home, Horizon Worlds, Horizon Workrooms, Horizon Venues and Horizon Marketplace
 Horizon, computer accounting system used in connection with the British Post Office scandal

Geology, soil science and archeology
 Horizon (archaeology), a distinctive sediment, artefact, style or other cultural trait that is found at archaeological sites across a large geographical area
 Horizon (geology), a bedding plane or a thin bed of distinctive character within a stratigraphic sequence
 Marker horizon, a distinctive stratigraphic unit, of the same age across several locations
 Soil horizon, a specific and distinctive layer in a land area

Physics
 Horizon (general relativity), that play a role in Einstein's theory of general relativity
 Absolute horizon, a boundary in spacetime in general relativity inside of which events cannot affect an external observer
 Apparent horizon, a surface defined in general relativity
 Cauchy horizon, a surface found in the study of Cauchy problems
 Celestial horizon, a great circle parallel to the horizon
 Cosmological horizon, a limit of observability: the maximum distance from which particles can have travelled to an observer in the age of the universe
 Event horizon, a boundary in spacetime beyond which events cannot affect the observer
 JPL Horizons On-Line Ephemeris System, an interactive facility that computes the position of many solar system objects
 Killing horizon, a null surface on which there is a Killing vector field
 Radio horizon, the locus of points in telecommunication at which direct rays from an antenna are tangential to the surface of the Earth

Transportation
 Horizon (railcar), an Amtrak passenger car used mostly in the Midwest
 Attitude indicator, or Artificial horizon, an instrument used in an aircraft to inform the pilot of the orientation of the airplane relative to the ground
 , a cruise ship operated by Carnival Cruise Line
 Chrysler Horizon, a car designed by Chrysler Europe
 Fisher Horizon, a kit aircraft
 Hawker Horizon, the original name of the Hawker 4000 business jet
 Halman Horizon, a Canadian sailboat design
 Horizon Air, a regional airline and subsidiary of the Alaska Air Group
 Horizon Airlines (Australia), an Australian airline based in Sydney
 Horizon-class frigate, a multi-national collaboration to produce a new generation of anti-air warfare frigates
 , a cruise ship operated by Pullmantur Cruises

Other uses
 Fusion of horizons, understanding that results from the dynamic process of integrating the 'Other' and the familiar
 Project Horizon, a study to determine the feasibility of the construction of a military base on the moon conducted in 1959

See also

 
 
 Bring Me the Horizon, a British rock band
 "Over the Rainbow", a song written for the movie The Wizard of Oz
 Mirage, a naturally occurring optical phenomenon in which light rays bend to produce a displaced image of distant objects
 New Horizons (disambiguation)
 New Horizon (disambiguation)